The 1902 Kansas State Aggies football team was an American football team that represented Kansas State Agricultural College during the 1902 college football season. In its first and only season under head coach Cyrus E. Dietz, the team compiled a 2–6 record and was outscored by a total of 121 to 46. On October 7, 1902, the Kansas State team played University of Kansas Jayhawks at McCook Field in Lawrence, KS, in the first meeting of a series that became the Kansas–Kansas State football rivalry. The team played its home games at Athletic Park in Manhattan, Kansas.

Schedule

References

Kansas State
Kansas State Wildcats football seasons
Kansas State Aggies football